The Primetime Emmy Award for Outstanding Directing for a Drama Series is presented to the best directing of a television drama series, usually for a particular episode.

Winners and nominations

1950s
{| class="wikitable" style="width:100%"
|- bgcolor="#bebebe"
! width="5%" | Year
! width="30%" | Program
! width="30%" | Episode
! width="30%" | Nominee(s)
! width="5%" | Network
|-
!colspan=5|Best Direction
|-
|rowspan=6 align=center|1955
|style="background:#FAEB86;"|Studio One
|style="background:#FAEB86;"| "Twelve Angry Men"
|style="background:#FAEB86;"|Franklin J. Schaffner
|style="background:#FAEB86;"|CBS
|-
|Four Star Playhouse
|"The Answer"
|Roy Kellino
|CBS
|-
|The Loretta Young Show
|"The Clara Schumann Story"
|Robert Florey
|NBC
|-
|The United States Steel Hour
|"The Interview"
|Alex Segal
|ABC
|-
|Waterfront
|"Christmas in San Pedro"
|Ted Post
|Syndicated
|-
|colspan=2|Your Hit Parade
|Clark Jones
|NBC
|-
|rowspan=13 align=center|1956
!colspan=4|Best Director - Film Series
|-
|colspan=2 style="background:#FAEB86;"|The Phil Silvers Show
|style="background:#FAEB86;"|Nat Hiken
|style="background:#FAEB86;"|CBS
|-
|Alfred Hitchcock Presents
|"The Case of Mr. Pelham"
|Alfred Hitchcock
|rowspan=2|CBS
|-
|The Bob Cummings Show
|"Return of the Wolf"
|Rod Amateau
|-
|colspan=2|Dragnet
|Jack Webb
|NBC
|-
|colspan=2|Make Room for Daddy
|Sheldon Leonard
|ABC
|-
|You Are There
|"Grant & Lee at Appomattox"
|Bernard Girard
|CBS
|-
!colspan=4|Best Director - Live Series
|-
|style="background:#FAEB86;"|Ford Star Jubilee
|style="background:#FAEB86;"|"The Cain Mutiny Court-Martial"
|style="background:#FAEB86;"|Franklin J. Schaffner
|style="background:#FAEB86;"|CBS
|-
|Climax!
|"Portrait in Celluloid"
|John Frankenheimer
|CBS
|-
|rowspan=2|Producers' Showcase
|"Peter Pan"
|Clark Jones
|rowspan=2|NBC
|-
|"Our Town"
|Delbert Mann
|-
|The United States Steel Hour
|"No Time for Sergeants"
|Alex Segal
|CBS
|-
|rowspan=13 align=center|1957
!colspan=4|Best Direction - Half-Hour or Less
|-
|style="background:#FAEB86;"|The Danny Thomas Show
|style="background:#FAEB86;"|"Danny's Comeback"
|style="background:#FAEB86;"|Sheldon Leonard
|style="background:#FAEB86;"|ABC
|-
|Camera Three
|"As I Lay Dying"
|Clay Yurdin
|rowspan=2|CBS
|-
|General Electric Theater
|"The Road That Led Afar"
|Herschel Daugherty
|-
|Tales of the 77th Bengal Lancers
|"The Traitor"
|George Archainbaud
|NBC
|-
|You Are There
|"First Moscow Purge Trial"
|William D. Russell 
|CBS
|-
!colspan=4|Best Direction - One Hour or More
|-
|style="background:#FAEB86;"|Playhouse 90
|style="background:#FAEB86;"|"Requiem for a Heavyweight"
|style="background:#FAEB86;"|Ralph Nelson
|style="background:#FAEB86;"|CBS
|-
|The Dinah Shore Chevy Show
|"October 5, 1956"
|Bob Banner
|rowspan=3|NBC
|-
|Kraft Television Theatre
|"A Night to Remember"
|George Roy Hill
|-
|NBC Opera Theatre
| align=center| "La Boheme"
|Kirk Browning
|-
|Playhouse 90
|"Forbidden Area"
|John Frankenheimer
|CBS
|-
|The 20th Century Fox Hour
|"Child of the Regiment"
|Lewis Allen
|CBS
|-
|rowspan=12 align=center|1958
!colspan=4|Best Direction - Half-Hour or Less
|-
|style="background:#FAEB86;"|Alfred Hitchcock Presents
|style="background:#FAEB86;"|"The Glass Eye"
|style="background:#FAEB86;"|Robert Stevens
|style="background:#FAEB86;"|CBS
|-
|colspan=2|The Danny Thomas Show
|Sheldon Leonard
|ABC & CBS
|-
|colspan=2|Father Knows Best
|Peter Tewksbury
|NBC
|-
|colspan=2|The Patrice Munsel Show
|Clark Jones
|ABC
|-
|colspan=2|Your Hit Parade
|Bill Hobin
|NBC
|-
!colspan=4|Best Direction - One Hour or More
|-
|colspan=2 style="background:#FAEB86;"|The Dinah Shore Chevy Show
|style="background:#FAEB86;"|Bob Banner
|style="background:#FAEB86;"|NBC
|-
|Hallmark Hall of Fame
|"The Green Pastures"
|George Schaefer
|NBC
|-
|rowspan=3|Playhouse 90
|"The Comedian"
|John Frankenheimer
|rowspan=3|CBS
|-
|"The Helen Morgan Story"
|George Roy Hill
|-
|"The Miracle Worker"
|Arthur Penn
|-
|rowspan=10 align=center|1959
!colspan=4|Best Direction of a Single Program of a Dramatic Series Less Than One Hour
|-
|style="background:#FAEB86;"|Alcoa-Goodyear Theatre
|style="background:#FAEB86;"|"Eddie"
|style="background:#FAEB86;"|Jack Smight|style="background:#FAEB86;"|NBC|-
|Alfred Hitchcock Presents
|"Lamb to the Slaughter"
|Alfred Hitchcock
|CBS
|-
|rowspan=2|General Electric Theater
|"Kid at the Stick"
|James Neilson
|rowspan=3|NBC
|-
|"One is a Wanderer"
|Herschel Daugherty
|-
|Peter Gunn
|"The Kill"
|Blake Edwards
|-
!colspan=4|Best Direction of a Single Dramatic Program – One Hour or Longer
|-
|style="background:#FAEB86;"|Hallmark Hall of Fame|style="background:#FAEB86;"|"Little Moon of Alban"|style="background:#FAEB86;"|George Schaefer|style="background:#FAEB86;"|NBC'|-
|rowspan=2|Playhouse 90|"Child of Our Time
|George Roy Hill
|rowspan=2|CBS
|-
|"A Town Has Turned to Dust"
|John Frankenheimer
|}

1960s

1970s

1980s

1990s

2000s

2010s

2020s

Total awards by network

 NBC – 21
 CBS – 17
 ABC – 11
 HBO – 10
 Netflix – 4
 Fox – 2
 Hulu – 1
 PBS – 1
 Showtime – 1

Programs with multiple awards

4 awards
 NYPD Blue (3 consecutive)

3 awards
 CBS Playhouse (consecutive)
 The Defenders (2 consecutive)
 Hill Street Blues (2 consecutive)
 The West Wing (2 consecutive)

2 awards
 Boardwalk Empire (consecutive)
 The Crown Cagney & Lacey (consecutive)
 Equal Justice (consecutive)
 ER Game of Thrones (consecutive)
 Hallmark Hall of FamePrograms with multiple nominations

13 nominations
 ER (NBC)
 The Sopranos (HBO)

12 nominations
 Hill Street Blues (NBC)
 L.A. Law (NBC)

11 nominations
 Game of Thrones (HBO)
 Hallmark Hall of Fame (NBC)

10 nominations
 Lou Grant (CBS)

9 nominations
 NYPD Blue (ABC)

8 nominations
 The West Wing (NBC)

7 nominations
 Playhouse 90 (CBS)

6 nominations
 Boardwalk Empire (HBO)
 CBS Playhouse (CBS)
 The Crown (Netflix)
 Homeland (Showtime)
 Ozark (Netflix)
 Succession (HBO)

5 nominations
 Breaking Bad (AMC)
 The Defenders (CBS)
 Fame (NBC)
 The Handmaid's Tale (Hulu)

4 nominations
 Downton Abbey (PBS)
 Lost (ABC)
 Mad Men (AMC)
 Moonlighting (ABC)
 Roots (ABC)

3 nominations
 24 (Fox)
 Boston Legal (ABC)
 Cagney & Lacey (CBS)
 Chicago Hope (CBS)
 China Beach (ABC)
 General Electric Theatre (NBC)
 Law & Order (NBC)
 Six Feet Under (HBO)
 The Waltons (CBS)

2 nominations
 Alcoa Premiere (ABC)
 Alfred Hitchcock Presents (CBS)
 Battlestar Galactica (Syfy)
 Bob Hope Presents the Chrysler Theatre (NBC)
 The Bold Ones: The Senator (NBC)
 Columbo (NBC)
 Damages (FX)
 Deadwood (HBO)
 The Dinah Shore Chevy Show (NBC)
 Equal Justice (ABC)
 Homicide: Life on the Street (NBC)
 House of Cards (Netflix)
 I'll Fly Away (NBC)
 The Knick (Cinemax)
 Kojak (CBS)
 Miami Vice (NBC)
 Producers' Showcase (NBC)
 Rich Man, Poor Man (PBS)
 Sirens (ABC)
 Stranger Things (Netflix)
 thirtysomething (ABC)
 The United States Steel Hour (ABC)
 Upstairs, Downstairs (PBS)
 Westinghouse Desilu Playhouse (CBS)
 The X-Files'' (Fox)

Individuals with multiple awards

3 awards
 Paul Bogart
 David Greene (2 consecutive)
 Mark Tinker (2 consecutive)

2 awards
 Paris Barclay (consecutive)
 Robert Butler
 Thomas Carter (consecutive)
 George Schaefer
 Franklin J. Schaffner (consecutive)
 Thomas Schlamme (consecutive)

Individuals with multiple nominations

10 nominations
 George Schaefer

9 nominations
 Tim Van Patten

7 nominations
 Paul Bogart

6 nominations
 Lesli Linka Glatter
 Mimi Leder

5 nominations
 Jack Bender
 Robert Butler
 Thomas Carter
 John Frankenheimer
 Alex Segal
 Mark Tinker

4 nominations
 Allen Coulter
 Vince Gilligan
 Gregory Hoblit
 Rod Holcomb
 Gene Reynolds
 Thomas Schlamme
 Scott Winant

3 nominations
 Paris Barclay
 Jason Bateman
 Burt Brinckerhoff
 Georg Stanford Brown
 Christopher Chulack
 Fielder Cook
 Bill D'Elia
 David Greene
 George Roy Hill
 Eric Laneuville
 David Nutter
 Sydney Pollack
 Jeremy Podeswa
 Franklin J. Schaffner
 Robert Scheerer
 Alan Taylor

2 nominations
 Phil Abraham
 Edward M. Abroms
 Corey Allen
 Alan Ball
 Bob Banner
 Jeff Bleckner
 Benjamin Caron
 Marvin J. Chomsky
 Stephen Daldry
 Mel Damski
 The Duffer Brothers
 Alex Graves
 Charles Haid
 Harry Harris
 Jessica Hobbs
 Clark Jones
 Jonathan Kaplan
 Lee H. Katzin
 Buzz Kulik
 Will Mackenzie
 Michelle MacLaren
 Nancy Malone
 Tom Moore
 Mark Mylod
 Ralph Nelson
 John Patterson
 Win Phelps
 Stuart Rosenberg
 Daniel Sackheim
 Miguel Sapochnik
 Edwin Sherin
 Jack Smight
 Steven Soderbergh
 Rick Wallace

See also
 Primetime Emmy Award for Outstanding Directing for a Comedy Series

Notes

References

Directing for a Drama Series